"Bring Out the Bottles" is a song by American singer, dancer, DJ and rapper Redfoo, also known for being half of the duo LMFAO. It was released on 28 December 2012. "Bring Out the Bottles" was produced by Redfoo, who also wrote the song along with Andre Smith and Brandon Garcia.

Background
The song is Redfoo's first solo single since 1998. It is similar in style to LMFAO's previous single "Champagne Showers".

Charts

Release history

References

2012 singles
Eurodance songs
Songs written by Redfoo
Interscope Records singles
2012 songs